International Left Handers Day is an international day observed annually on August 13 to celebrate the uniqueness and differences of left-handed individuals. The day was first observed in 1976 by Dean R. Campbell, founder of Lefthanders International, Inc. 

International Lefthanders Day was created to celebrate sinistrality and raise awareness of the advantages and disadvantages of being left-handed in a predominantly right-handed world. It celebrates left-handed people’s uniqueness and differences, a subset of humanity comprising seven to ten percent of the world's population. The day also spreads awareness on issues faced by left-handers, e.g. the importance of the special needs for left-handed children, and the likelihood for left-handers to develop schizophrenia.

Several media outlets and commercial associations have made one-off posts and compilations of accomplished left-handed people in recognition of the holiday.

Further reading

References 

August observances
lefthanders
Handedness
1976 introductions